The following is a list of state symbols of the U.S. state of Mississippi, as defined by state statutes in Title 1, Section 3 of the Mississippi Code of 1972 and listed in the Mississippi Official & Statistical Register.

Insignia

Flora

Fauna

Other

References

 
Mississippi
Mississippi culture
Symbols